The 1960 Lamar Tech Cardinals football team represented Lamar State College of Technology—now known as Lamar University—as a member of the Lone Star Conference (LSC) during the 1960 NCAA College Division football season. Led by eighth-year head coach James B. Higgins, the Cardinals compiled an overall record of 8–4 with a mark of 5–2 in conference play conference, tying for second place in the LSC.

Schedule

References

Lamar Tech
Lamar Cardinals football seasons
Lamar Tech Cardinals football